E3 ubiquitin-protein ligase SMURF1 is an enzyme that in humans is encoded by the SMURF1 gene.

Function 

This gene encodes a ubiquitin ligase that is specific for receptor-regulated SMAD proteins in the bone morphogenetic protein (BMP) pathway. A similar protein in Xenopus is involved in embryonic pattern formation. Alternative splicing results in multiple transcript variants encoding different isoforms. An additional transcript variant has been identified, but its full length sequence has not been determined.

Interactions
SMURF1 has been shown to interact with:
 ARHGEF9, 
 PLEKHO1,  and
 SMURF2.

References

Further reading

External links